A pentameric protein is a quaternary protein structure that consists of five protein subunits.

Examples

Ligand-gated ion channels

Five sub-units come together to form a channel. Each channel consist of two alpha chain, one beta, one gamma and one delta chain. These five chains assemble together (along with certain receptors like protons or acetylcholine) forming the structure of the channel. A ligand-gated ion channel on the post-synaptic junction of the muscle-end plate is an example of such a channel. They are acetylcholine-operated ion channels, which means that acetylcholine brings about a conformational change. The channel allows the free movement of the cations like Na and K when acetylcholine binds to its receptors.

Viral capsids
Many viral capsids are formed by hexameric and pentameric proteins. Such capsids are assigned a triangulation number (T-number) which describe relation between the number of pentagons and hexagons.

Carboxysomes
Protein enclosing bacterial organelles carboxysome is also made up of pentameric protein.

Major histocompatibility complex (MHC) pentamers
Synthetic pentameric proteins include MHC pentamers, a type of MHC multimer, comprising five peptide-MHC complexes associated via a coiled-coil domain, attached to five fluorophore moieties.  These proteins are used as reagents in immunology research.

See also 
 Pentamer

References 

Protein structure